Purple Tunnel of Doom was the name ascribed to the I-395 Third Street tunnel in downtown Washington, D.C., where thousands of holders of purple tickets lined up to witness the first inauguration of Barack Obama on January 20, 2009. Ticket colors corresponded to assigned viewing areas. Many were not admitted, despite having stood in line for hours.

History
People were directed into the Third Street tunnel by police, but were not allowed to exit.

Among those who missed the ceremony were Seattle Mayor Greg Nickels, San Mateo County Supervisor Warren Slocum, daughters of Kathleen Kennedy Townsend, the chief legislative counsel for Lamar Alexander,, staffers for John Barrasso, and foreign policy advisers and multiple members of staff from the Obama campaign.

News reports put the total number of purple-ticket-holders who were denied entrance to the inauguration at between 1,000 and 4,000. Pictures show a lack of law enforcement or event personnel, and an overall bleak situation without basic amenities such as wayfinding or facilities.

Similarly affected were blue-ticket-holders on the south side of the Capitol. Thousands of ticket-holders waiting outside the Blue Gate – in and around the triangular area bordered by C Street, 2nd Street, and Washington Avenue SW – were denied entrance as a result of a massive gate management failure. Terrance W. Gainer, the Sergeant at Arms of the United States Senate, stated that it appeared that the breakdown had occurred because there were more purple and blue tickets for those sections than bulky people in coats would permit.

The experience in the tunnel has been chronicled in numerous videos posted on YouTube, and in detailed accounts by The Huffington Post.

On January 22, 2009, the Joint Congressional Committee on Inaugural Ceremonies said that blue-, silver-, and purple-ticket-holders who were not admitted would receive copies of the swearing-in invitation and program, photos of Obama and Vice President Joe Biden, and a color print of the ceremony.

Lessons learned
A multi-agency study was led by the Secret Service.

For Obama's second inauguration, the tunnel was closed.

References

External links
Survivors of the Purple Tunnel of Doom

First inauguration of Barack Obama
Crowd control
Buildings and structures in Washington, D.C.